"It All Comes Out in the Wash" is a song co-written and recorded by American country music artist Miranda Lambert. It was released on July 18, 2019, as the lead-off single from Lambert's seventh studio album Wildcard. The album was released on November 1, 2019.

Composition
Lambert wrote the song with a songwriting collective known as the "Love Junkies," which is composed of Hillary Lindsey, Lori McKenna, and Liz Rose. She described the writing process for the song as "fun" and that the hook was inspired by an idiom often used by her mom and grandma ("it will all come out in the wash") that she felt described getting "over the hump" after her last record which took her through a lot of personal trials and tribulations: "I think that it's got some sarcasm to it, but it's very honest. I haven't had a single out in a long time, and I'm just ready to have new music. I'm in a new phase of my life and ready to have new music out there that represents that," she explained. "This one just felt perfect as far as the vibe of it. It’s fun and lighthearted and I'm really excited about it."

It was produced by Jay Joyce, marking the first time Lambert has worked with the producer.

"Locomotive", another song Lambert co-wrote with Ashley Monroe and K.S. Rhoads and first previewed on the CMA Music Festival in June 2019, was also released alongside the single.

Critical reception
The song was nominated for Best Country Song at the 62nd Annual Grammy Awards.

Chart performance
"It All Comes Out in the Wash" debuted at number 19 on the Billboard Country Airplay chart and number 36 on the Billboard Hot Country Songs chart, for the chart dated July 27, 2019. It is her best opening on the former chart since "Vice" started at number 18 in July 2016. It debuted on the Hot 100 at number 70 for the week dated November 16, 2019. It has sold 43,000 copies in the United States as of November 2019.

Music video
The music video premiered on August 29, 2019 and was directed by Trey Fanjoy. In it, Lambert and her friends are shown mudding and then taking their vehicles to the car wash, which she is also shown performing at with her band.

Charts

Weekly charts

Year-end charts

Certifications

References

2019 songs
2019 singles
Miranda Lambert songs
RCA Records Nashville singles
Songs written by Miranda Lambert
Songs written by Hillary Lindsey
Songs written by Lori McKenna
Songs written by Liz Rose
Song recordings produced by Jay Joyce